Bakery in Brooklyn is a 2016 American-Spanish romantic comedy film starring Aimee Teegarden and Krysta Rodriguez.

Cast
Aimee Teegarden as Vivien
Krysta Rodriguez as Chloe
Griffin Newman as Ian
Ernie Sabella as Dave
Blanca Suárez as Daniella
Ward Horton as Paul
Aitor Luna as Fernando
Anthony Chisolm as Nathan
Linda Lavin as Isabelle
Josh Pais as Alexander Johnson (Lawyer)

Plot
Two cousins, raised as sisters, set out to save the family bakery. The owner, their aunt, dies suddenly and unexpectedly. A banker is trying to foreclose on bakery, but is prevented from doing so when it's declared a heritage site. The cousins succeed in saving the bakery.

(In a completely, seemingly unrelated side plot, an old couple tries to kill Danielle and Ian with poisoned tea.)

The movie ends with Vivien and Paul kissing by a tree in a square in Valencia.

Reception
The film has a 43% rating on Rotten Tomatoes.  Brad Wheeler of The Globe and Mail awarded the film half a star out of four.  John Hartl of The Seattle Times awarded the film one and a half stars out of four.

References

External links
 
 

American romantic comedy films
Films set in Brooklyn
Films set in New York City
Films set in New York (state)
Spanish romantic comedy films
2016 romantic comedy films
Films scored by Lucio Godoy
2010s English-language films
2010s American films